Górnik Zabrze Spółka Akcyjna, commonly referred to as Górnik Zabrze S.A. or simply Górnik Zabrze, is a Polish football club from Zabrze. Górnik is one of the most successful Polish football clubs in history, winning the second-most Polish Championship titles together with Ruch Chorzów. The club was a dominant force in the 1960s and 1980s. Górnik holds the record for winning the most consecutive Polish Championship titles (5) and Polish Cup titles (5). In addition, the club was 1969–70 Cup Winners' Cup runners-up.

The club plays in a white or dark blue-red kit, and is based at the Arena Zabrze. Their main local rival is Ruch Chorzów.

History

First years 

The club was founded in 1948 after several smaller sports associations – KS Zjednoczenie, KS Pogoń, KS Skra, and KS Concordia – were merged into a single organization, which took the name "Górnik", the Polish word for "Miner", reflecting the fact that Zabrze was an important coal-mining centre.

In 1950 Górnik joined the Opole Silesia regional league. In 1952 the club was promoted to the Polish Second Division. Their first game in the second tier was against Skra Częstochowa, and was witnessed by 20,000 fans, with Górnik winning 5–1. The whole season was very successful and Górnik finished second overall, behind Górnik Wałbrzych.

The club was promoted to the top division in 1955. In their first game in the top flight Górnik beat local rivals Ruch Chorzów 3–1, with 25,000 in attendance; the club finished the season in sixth place.

First successes 
In 1957, just a year after promotion, Górnik won its first championship of Poland. The team, with star, Ernest Pohl, was third in 1958, to regain the crown in 1959 and 1961, together with such players as Stanisław Oślizło and Hubert Kostka. In 1961 Górnik for the first time appeared in European Cups, losing in the first round to Tottenham Hotspur.

Golden years 

The next championship, won in 1963, marked the beginning of an unusual streak of five consecutive titles (1963, 64, 65, 66 and 67), which is a Polish record.

Górnik's biggest success in European football took place in 1970 (even though in Poland the team was second, after Legia Warsaw). In the UEFA Cup Winners Cup, Gornik beat all their opponents – Olympiacos, Rangers, Levski Sofia and AS Roma, reaching the final, which took place in Vienna. There, Manchester City turned out to be the better team, winning 2–1. The following season Górnik would once again play Manchester City, with the 1970 final being repeated this time in the quarter-final.

Late 1970s and early 1980s 
During the mid-1970s Górnik form deteriorated and in late spring of 1978, the team was relegated to the Second Division. However, it returned after one year and in games of 1979–80, Zabrze's side finished sixth. In 1984, after purchasing of a group of talented players (Ryszard Komornicki, Waldemar Matysik, Eugeniusz Cebrat, Andrzej Zgutczyński, Tadeusz Dolny, Andrzej Pałasz), Górnik finished fourth, which was a sign of better times.

Late 1980s until now 
Between 1985 and 1988 Górnik again marked a magnificent streak, with four consecutive championships. Zabrze's side also played versus renowned European powerhouses, such as Bayern Munich, Anderlecht, Hamburger SV, Juventus and Real Madrid.

In 1994 Górnik competed again for the title and with players as Jerzy Brzęczek, Grzegorz Mielcarski, Tomasz Wałdoch, hopes were high. Before the last round of the league the standings at the top were: Legia 47 points and Górnik 45 points. Since the two teams were to face each other in Warsaw, Górnik still had a chance to win the title. However the game ended in a 1–1 tie which gave Legia the crown. Before Legia scored the goal which gave her the title (the score 0–1 would mean the title for Górnik), the referee of the match – Mr Redzinski – sent off one by one 3 players from Górnik's squad, and Górnik had to finished match with only 8 players against 11 players of Legia. It was the last match in Mr Redzinski's career.

In the same year, Górnik played its last so far game in European Cups, losing to Admira Wacker Vienna.

In the spring of 2007 Górnik got a new sponsor – German insurance company Allianz. However, after finishing 16th in the Ekstraklasa in 2008–09, the club was relegated to the Polish First League, the second level of Polish football, during the 2009–10 season. In June 2010, the club earned promotion back to the Ekstraklasa for the 2010–11 season. Since then, Górnik has promoted a number of players to the Poland national team and transferred several players to stronger leagues, including Arkadiusz Milik, Łukasz Skorupski, Szymon Żurkowski and Paweł Bochniewicz.

Honours 

Ekstraklasa
Champions (14): 1957, 1959, 1961, 1962–63, 1963–64, 1964–65, 1965–66, 1966–67, 1970–71, 1971–72, 1984–85, 1985–86, 1986–87, 1987–88
Runners-up (4): 1962, 1968–69, 1973–74, 1990–91
Polish Cup
Winners (6): 1964–65, 1967–68, 1968–69, 1969–70, 1970–71, 1971–72
Runners-up (7): 1955–56, 1956–57, 1961–62, 1965–66, 1985–86, 1991–92, 2000–01
Polish SuperCup
Winners: 1988
 European Cup
Quarter-Final: 1967–68
 UEFA Cup Winners' Cup
Runners-up: 1969–70
Youth Teams:
Polish U-19 Champion: 1967, 1989
 Polish U-19 Runner Up: 1985, 2001, 2011
 Polish U-19 Bronze Medal: 2015
 Polish U-17 Champion: 1992, 1996
 Polish U-17 Runner Up: 2014

Górnik in Europe

Best results in European competitions

Current squad

Out on loan

Notable former players 

 Ernest Pohl
 Włodzimierz Lubański
 Jerzy Gorgoń
 Stanisław Oślizło
 Hubert Kostka
 Jan Urban
 Ryszard Cyroń
 Tomasz Hajto
 Robert Warzycha
 Piotr Jegor
 Andrzej Szarmach
 Zygfryd Szołtysik
 Ryszard Komornicki
 Kamil Kosowski
 Marcin Kuźba
 Jerzy Brzęczek
 Michał Pazdan
 Arkadiusz Milik
 Tomasz Wałdoch
 Józef Wandzik
 Dariusz Koseła
 Andrzej Niedzielan
 Ryszard Staniek
 Ryszard Kraus
 Andrzej Zgutczyński
 Marek Bęben
 Tomasz Zahorski
 Marek Szemoński
 José Kanté
 Māris Smirnovs
 Dickson Choto
 Shingayi Kaondera
 Aco Stojkov
 Prejuce Nakoulma
 Dimitar Makriev
 Michał Bemben
 Sergei Mošnikov
 Ivica Križanac
 Erik Jirka
 Boris Pandža
 Ensar Arifović
 Vladimir Sladojević 
 Armin Ćerimagić 
 Marek Koźmiński
 Igor Angulo
 Giorgos Giakoumakis

Managers 

 Ginter Pawelczyk (1948–49)
 Teodor Meiser (1949)
 Karol Luks (1949–50)
 Gerard Wodarz (1950–54)
 Augustyn Dziwisz (1954–56)
 Paweł Mościński (1956)
 Hubert Skolik (1957)
 Zoltán Opata (1957–58)
 Hubert Skolik (1958–59)
 Janos Steiner (1959)
 Feliks Karolek (1960)
 Vilém Lugr (1960)
 A. Dziwisz (1 July 1960–30 June 62)
 Feliks Karolek (1962)
 Ewald Cebula (1962–63)
 Feliks Karolek (1963)
 Hubert Skolik (1963)
 Feliks Karolek (1964)
 Hubert Skolik (1964)
 Ferenc Farsang (1964–65)
 W. Giergiel (1 July 1965–30 June 66)
 Géza Kalocsay (1 July 1966–30 June 69)
 Michał Matyas (1969–70)
 Ferenc Szusza (1970–71)
 A. Brzeżańczyk (1 July 1971–30 April 72)
 Jan Kowalski (1972)
 Gyula Szücs (1972)
 Jan Kowalski (1972–73)
 Teodor Wieczorek (1973–75)
 Andrzej Gajewski (1975–76)
 Józef Trepka (1976)
 Hubert Kostka (30 May 1976–5 Dec 77)
 W. Jan Żmuda (13 Dec 1977–24 May 80)
 Zdzisław Podedworny (1980–83)
 Hubert Kostka (1 Dec 1983–30 May 86)
 L. Ćmikiewicz (1 June 1986–14 Oct 86)
 A. Piechniczek (15 Oct 1986–30 June 87)
 M. Bochynek (1 July 1987–30 June 89)
 Zdzisław Podedworny (1989)
 Jan Kisiel (1989–90)
 Jan Kowalski (1990–92)
 Janusz Kowalik (1992)
 Alojzy Łysk (1992–93)
 Henryk Apostel (1 July 1993–31 Dec 93)
 Hubert Kostka (1 Jan 1994–22 May 94)
 E. Lorens (23 May 1994–2 June 95)
 Stanisław Oślizło (1995)
 Adam Michalski (1995–96)
 Jan Kowalski (1996)
 Jan Żurek (11 Aug 1996–11 Sept 96)
 Piotr Kocąb (1996)
 Henryk Apostel (1 Jan 1997–10 Nov 97)
 Jan Kowalski (1997)
 Jan Żurek (1 Dec 1997–15 March 00)
 J. Dankowski (int.) (16 Mar 2000–19 Mar 00)
 M. Bochynek (20 March 2000–9 April 00)
 M. Broniszewski (10 April 2000–16 Sept 00)
 J. Dankowski (17 Sept 2000–7 May 01)
 M. Piotrowicz (2001)
 W. Fornalik (10 May 2001–31 Oct 01)
 M. Piotrowicz (2 Nov 2001–31 Dec 01)
 W. Fornalik (12 Jan 2002–4 April 04)
 Verner Lička (5 April 2004–13 Dec 04)
 Edward Lorens (13 Dec 2004–3 Feb 05)
 M. Wleciałowski (7 Feb 2005–31 Oct 05)
 Marek Motyka (4 Nov 2005–13 Jan 06)
 R. Komornicki (13 Jan 2006–19 April 06)
 P. Cecherz (int.) (19 April 2006–26 April 06)
 Marek Motyka (26 April 2006–12 Dec 06)
 Zdzisław Podedworny (2006–07)
 M. Motyka (13 March 2007–20 May 07)
 Marek Kostrzewa (2007)
 Marek Piotrowicz (2007)
 R. Wieczorek (1 July 2007–10 Sept 08)
 M. Bochynek (int.) (2 Sept 2008–16 Sept 08)
 H. Kasperczak (16 Sept 2008–3 June 09)
 R. Komornicki (18 June 2009–15 Dec 09)
 Adam Nawałka (1 Jan 2010–31 Oct 13)
 B. Zając (int.) (1 Nov 2013–10 Nov 13)
 R. Wieczorek (12 Nov 2013–9 March 14)
 R. Warzycha (12 March 2014–30 June 14)
 J. Dankowski (1 July 2014–30 June 15)
 R. Warzycha (1 July 2015–13 Aug 15)
 L. Ojrzyński (13 Aug 2015–3 March 16)
 J. Żurek (3 March 2016–2 June 16)
 M. Brosz (3 June 2016–27 May 21)
 J. Urban (27 May 2021 – 15 June 2022)
 B. Gaul (23 June 2022–present)

Supporters and rivalries 

Górnik Zabrze is believed to have one of the largest and most loyal fanbases in Poland, especially in the Upper Silesian metropolitan area. In the 2016–17 season, Górnik Zabrze drew the highest average home attendance (10,636) of all second level Polish football clubs. They also drew the highest attendance in their league (20,987). After their comeback to the top flight in 2017, Górnik drew the highest average home attendance in Polish football, surpassing current top teams Lech Poznań and Legia Warsaw, with most league games being sold-out.

Górnik holds a long-standing rivalry with Upper Silesian side Ruch Chorzów, known as the Great Silesian Derby. Other main rivals are Piast Gliwice, Polonia Bytom, Legia Warsaw and Zagłębie Sosnowiec.

Torcida Zabrze is named after the ultras of Torcida Split, with whom they have friendly relations; together they are called United Torcida. The have also friendly relations with fans of ROW Rybnik, Wisłoka Dębica, and GKS Katowice; the latter in past used to be a rival. Fans of Concordia Knurów, Naprzód Rydłutowy, Slavia Ruda Śląska and Czarni Pyskowice are also Górnik fan-clubs.

References

External links 

 
Fansite 
Fans' forum 

 
Association football clubs established in 1948
1948 establishments in Poland
Mining association football clubs in Poland